Malnaș is a commune in Covasna County, Transylvania Romania composed of three villages:
Malnaș
Malnaș-Băi / Málnásfürdő
 Valea Zălanului / Zalánpatak

In 2004 Bixad and Micfalău split from Malnaș and formed independent communes. Malnaș is in the northern part of Covasna County, in the Baraolt Mountains.

Demographics

The commune has an absolute Székely Hungarian majority. According to the 2002 Census it has a population of 4,877 of which 96.49% or 4,706 are Hungarian.

Valea Zălanului

Valea Zălanului village, with a population of 149 in 2002, was first settled in the 16th century. In 2008, Charles, Prince of Wales bought a house in the village, which was probably founded by one of the Prince's Transylvanian ancestors. By 2013, when he made another purchase, he had four houses there.

References

Communes in Covasna County
Localities in Transylvania